Eirik Langeland Fjeld (born 6 September 1973) is a Norwegian politician for the Socialist Left Party.

He served as a deputy representative to the Norwegian Parliament from Hordaland during the term 1997–2001.

He currently resides in Bergen, living at Møllendal with his dog, Ponte.

References

1973 births
Living people
Socialist Left Party (Norway) politicians
Deputy members of the Storting
Hordaland politicians
Place of birth missing (living people)
21st-century Norwegian politicians